Scott Talan is a full-time professor of Public Relations and Strategic Communication at American University where he specializes in social media and personal branding. He has worked in media, PR, and communications in four distinct fields: TV News, Politics, Nonprofits and Higher Education.

Talan received his Master's degree in Public Administration from Harvard University's Kennedy School of Government. Before that, he studied broadcast journalism at Stanford University after getting his BA from the University of California at Davis. His first career was in nonprofit communications working for the March of Dimes. After that, he took a job as an elected city council member and Mayor of Lafayette, California, where he was the Bay Area's youngest mayor. Talan has worked as a writer at ABC News Good Morning America.

In 2005, he moved to Washington, D.C., and started his education career as an adjunct professor at George Washington University.

References

Living people
American male journalists
Stanford University alumni
American University faculty and staff
Harvard Kennedy School alumni
University of California, Davis alumni
Year of birth missing (living people)